Studenec pri Krtini is a settlement in the Municipality of Domžale in the Upper Carniola region of Slovenia.

Name
The name of the settlement was changed from Studenec to Studenec pri Krtini in 1953, literally 'Studenec near Krtina'. The first part of the name, Studenec, comes from the Slovene common noun studenec 'spring'. In the past the German name was Studenz.

History
The settlement used to be part of the Dominion of Krumperk.

References

External links

Studenec pri Krtini on Geopedia

Populated places in the Municipality of Domžale